Sturt County is one of the 141 Cadastral divisions of New South Wales. It contains the locality of Carrathool. The Murrumbidgee River is the southern boundary.

Sturt County was named in honour of the explorer, soldier and public servant Charles Sturt (1795-1869).

Parishes within this county
A full list of parishes found within this county; their current LGA and mapping coordinates to the approximate centre of each location is as follows:

References

 
Counties of New South Wales